Jack Samuel Bateson is an English professional boxer. As an amateur he won a gold medal at the 2011 Commonwealth Youth Games and bronze at the 2013 European Championships.

Early life
Jack Samuel Bateson was born on 3 June 1994 in Leeds, England. He began boxing at the age of nine, explaining in an interview with Boxing Social, "I only started boxing when I were about nine because me older brother Tom packed up and I felt a bit sorry for me dad who coached him". He had his first amateur fight at the age of 12 and remained unbeaten in 12 bouts before suffering his first defeat while representing England, saying on the loss, "Before I knew it, I were unbeaten in 12 and boxing for England against Ireland. I lost by a point and cried my eyes out. I never wanted to experience that pain again."

He attended Allerton High School in Alwoodley, Leeds, achieving 10 GCSEs, before gaining a triple distinction in an Advanced Apprenticeship in Sporting Excellence course, eventually moving on to study for a foundation degree in Sports Coaching.

Amateur career 
During an amateur career in which he competed for Team GB, securing over 100 wins from 120 fights, he won gold medals at the 2011 Commonwealth Youth Games, the ABA Championships in 2012 at light-flyweight and again the following year at flyweight, and a bronze medal at the 2013 European Championships. He also competed at the 2011 European Youth Championships, 2012 Youth World Championships, 2013 World Championships and the 2014 European Union Championships.

Professional career
Bateson made his professional debut on 1 September 2017, scoring a first-round technical knockout (TKO) victory over Zsolt Sarkozi at the Elland Road Banqueting Suite in Leeds.

After compiling a record of 12–0 (3 KOs), it was announced in June 2020 that he had signed a management deal with MTK Global.

Professional boxing record

References

External links
 
 Jack Bateson's official website

Living people
Year of birth missing (living people)
Date of birth missing (living people)
English male boxers
Sportspeople from Leeds
Super-bantamweight boxers
Featherweight boxers